The 2021–22 season is Rotherham United's 97th year in their history and first season back in League One since the 2019–20 season following relegation last season. Along with the league, the club will also compete in the FA Cup, the EFL Cup and the EFL Trophy. The season covers the period from 1 July 2021 to 30 June 2022.

Squad statistics

Player statistics
 
Players with zero appearances have been unused substitutes in one or more games.

Goalscorers

Pre-season
The Millers announced they would have friendly matches against Parkgate, Frickley Athletic, Rochdale, Harrogate Town, Grimsby Town, Newcastle United, Belper Town and Middlesbrough as part of their pre-season preparations. As part of a training camp in Hungary, the club arranged a behind-closed-doors friendly against III. Kerületi TVE in Budapest.

Competitions

League One

League table

Results summary

Results by matchday

Matches
Rotherham United's fixtures were announced on 24 June 2021.

FA Cup

Rotherham were drawn at home to Bromley in the first round, Stockport County in the second round and away to Queens Park Rangers in the third round.

EFL Cup

The Millers were drawn at home to Accrington Stanley in the first round.

EFL Trophy

Rotherham were drawn into Northern Group E alongside Doncaster Rovers, Manchester City U21s and Scunthorpe United. The group stage match dates were confirmed on July 9. In the knock-out stage, United were drawn away to Crewe Alexandra in the third round and at home to Cambridge United in the quarter-finals.

Transfers

Transfers in

Loans in

Loans out

Transfers out

References

Rotherham United
Rotherham United F.C. seasons